Counter admiral is a rank found in many navies of the world, but no longer used in English-speaking countries, where the equivalent rank is rear admiral. The term derives from the French contre-amiral. Depending on the country, it is either a one-star or two-star rank.

In modern navies that use it, rear (counter) admiral is generally, although not always, the lowest flag officer rank (in the German Navy, for instance, Flottillenadmiral ranks below Konteradmiral; in the Royal Canadian Navy, contre-amiral/rear admiral ranks above commodore).

French speaking countries

It is usually placed above ship-of-the-line captain and below vice admiral.

Germany

Konteradmiral is an OF-7 two-star rank of Deutsche Marine (German Navy), equivalent to the Generalmajor (en: Major general) in the German Army and the German Air Force.

Nordic countries

The rank of counter admiral is used in all the Nordic countries.

Denmark and Norway

Finland
Counter admiral is the more direct translation of Finnish kontra-amiraali, a two-star rank used in the Finnish Navy and the Finnish Border Guard. However, it is usually translated as rear admiral in international use.

Sweden

Portuguese speaking countries
In the navies of Brazil and Angola the rank of contra-almirante is the lowest of the flag officer ranks. In the navies of Portugal and Mozambique the rank of contra-almirante is the second lowest, above that of comodoro (commodore).

Until the end of the 19th century, the present rank of contra-almirante was named chefe de esquadra (chief of squadron), both in the Portuguese and in the Brazilian navies.

Russia and other former communist countries
Kontr-admiral was the lowest flag officer rank of the Soviet Navy and is the lowest flag rank of the Russian Navy, similar to an OF-6 officer.

NATO code
While the rank of counter admiral is used in a number of NATO countries, it is ranked differently depending on the country.

Gallery

References 

Admirals
Naval ranks